Nikolay Nikolov (born 15 October 1964, in Beloslav) is a retired Bulgarian pole vaulter. He is best known for winning a silver medal at the 1988 European Indoor Championships.

His personal best jump was 5.72 metres, achieved in July 1991 in Sofia. This ranks him third among Bulgarian pole vaulters, only behind Spas Bukhalov and Atanas Tarev.

Achievements

References

1964 births
Living people
Bulgarian male pole vaulters